The 2013–14 Tampa Bay Lightning season was the franchise's 22nd season in the National Hockey League (NHL).

Standings

Schedule and results

Preseason

|- align="center" bgcolor="ccffcc"
| 1 || September 18 || St. Louis Blues || 4–3 || SO || Gudlevskis || Amway Center ||  || 1–0–0 || 
|- align="center" bgcolor="ccffcc"
| 2 || September 19 || Nashville Predators || 5–1 ||  || Helenius || Tampa Bay Times Forum || 10,332 || 2–0–0 || 
|- align="center" bgcolor="ccffcc"
| 3 || September 20 || @ St. Louis Blues || 4–3 ||  || Lindback || Scottrade Center || 13,246 || 3–0–0 || 
|- align="center" bgcolor="ccffcc"
| 4 || September 21 || Florida Panthers || 5–4 || SO || Bishop || Tampa Bay Times Forum || 13,135|| 4–0–0 || 
|- align="center" bgcolor="ffcccc"
| 5 || September 24 || @ Nashville Predators || 1–2 ||  || Lindback || Bridgestone Arena || 13,089 || 4–1–0 || 
|- align="center" bgcolor="ccffcc"
| 6 || September 26 || Florida Panthers || 3–2 || OT || Bishop || Germain Arena ||  || 5–1–0 || 
|- align="center" bgcolor="ffcccc"
| 7 || September 28 || @ Florida Panthers || 3–5 ||  || Lindback || BB&T Center || 12,547 || 5–2–0 || 
|-

|-
| 2013 Preseason Schedule
|-
| Lightning score listed first;

Regular season

|- align="center" bgcolor="ffcccc"
| 1 || October 3 || @ Boston Bruins || 1–3 ||  || Lindback || TD Garden || 17,565 || 0–1–0 || 0 || 
|- align="center" bgcolor="ccffcc"
| 2 || October 5 || @ Chicago Blackhawks || 3–2 || SO || Bishop || United Center || 21,563 || 1–1–0 || 2 || 
|- align="center" bgcolor="ccffcc"
| 3 || October 8 || @ Buffalo Sabres || 3–2 || OT || Bishop || First Niagara Center || 18,243 || 2–1–0 || 4 || 
|- align="center" bgcolor="ccffcc"
| 4 || October 10 || Florida Panthers || 7–2 ||  || Bishop || Tampa Bay Times Forum || 19,204 || 3–1–0 || 6 || 
|- align="center" bgcolor="ffcccc"
| 5 || October 12 || Pittsburgh Penguins || 4–5 ||  || Lindback || Tampa Bay Times Forum || 18,939 || 3–2–0 || 6 || 
|- align="center" bgcolor="ccffcc"
| 6 || October 15 || Los Angeles Kings || 5–1 ||  || Bishop || Tampa Bay Times Forum || 16,310 || 4–2–0 || 8 || 
|- align="center" bgcolor="ccffcc"
| 7 || October 17 || Minnesota Wild || 3–1 ||  || Bishop || Tampa Bay Times Forum || 16,454 || 5–2–0 || 10 || 
|- align="center" bgcolor="ffcccc"
| 8 || October 19 || Boston Bruins || 0–5 ||  || Bishop || Tampa Bay Times Forum || 18,512 || 5–3–0 || 10 || 
|- align="center" bgcolor="ccffcc"
| 9 || October 24 || Chicago Blackhawks || 6–5 || OT || Bishop || Tampa Bay Times Forum || 18,820 || 6–3–0 || 12 || 
|- align="center" bgcolor="ccffcc"
| 10 || October 26 || Buffalo Sabres || 3–2 ||  || Bishop || Tampa Bay Times Forum || 18,088 || 7–3–0 || 14 || 
|- align="center" bgcolor="ccffcc"
| 11 || October 27 || @ Florida Panthers || 4–3 || SO || Lindback || BB&T Center || 12,336 || 8–3–0 || 16 || 
|- align="center" bgcolor="ffcccc"
| 12 || October 29 || @ New Jersey Devils || 1–2 ||  || Bishop || Prudential Center || 13,501 || 8–4–0 || 16 || 
|-

|- align="center" bgcolor="ccffcc"
| 13 || November 1 || @ Carolina Hurricanes || 3–0 ||  || Bishop || PNC Arena || 14,828 || 9–4–0 || 18 || 
|- align="center" bgcolor="ccffcc"
| 14 || November 2 || St. Louis Blues || 4–2 ||  || Bishop || Tampa Bay Times Forum || 18,885 || 10–4–0 || 20 || 
|- align="center" bgcolor="ccffcc"
| 15 || November 7 || Edmonton Oilers || 4–2 ||  || Bishop || Tampa Bay Times Forum || 18,695 || 11–4–0 || 22 || 
|- align="center" bgcolor="ccffcc"
| 16 || November 9 || @ Detroit Red Wings || 3–2 || OT || Bishop || Joe Louis Arena || 20,066 || 12–4–0 || 24 || 
|- align="center" bgcolor="ffcccc"
| 17 || November 11 || @ Boston Bruins || 0–3 ||  || Lindback || TD Garden || 17,565 || 12–5–0 || 24 || 
|- align="center" bgcolor="ccffcc"
| 18 || November 12 || @ Montreal Canadiens || 2–1 || SO || Bishop || Bell Centre || 21,273 || 13–5–0 || 26 || 
|- align="center" bgcolor="ccffcc"
| 19 || November 14 || Anaheim Ducks || 5–1 ||  || Bishop || Tampa Bay Times Forum || 17,763 || 14–5–0 || 28 || 
|- align="center" bgcolor="ffcccc"
| 20 || November 16 || @ Phoenix Coyotes || 3–6 ||  || Bishop || Jobing.com Arena || 12,562 || 14–6–0 || 28 || 
|- align="center" bgcolor="ffcccc"
| 21 || November 19 || @ Los Angeles Kings || 2–5 ||  || Bishop || Staples Center || 18,118 || 14–7–0 || 28 || 
|- align="center" bgcolor="ffcccc"
| 22 || November 21 || @ San Jose Sharks || 1–5 ||  || Lindback || SAP Center at San Jose || 17,562 || 14–8–0 || 28 || 
|- align="center" bgcolor="B0C4DE"
| 23 || November 22 || @ Anaheim Ducks || 0–1 || OT || Bishop || Honda Center || 16,648 || 14–8–1 || 29 || 
|- align="center" bgcolor="ccffcc"
| 24 || November 25 || New York Rangers || 5–0 ||  || Bishop || Tampa Bay Times Forum || 19,204 || 15–8–1 || 31 || 
|- align="center" bgcolor="ccffcc"
| 25 || November 27 || Philadelphia Flyers || 4–2 ||  || Lindback || Tampa Bay Times Forum || 18,427 || 16–8–1 || 33 || 
|- align="center" bgcolor="ffcccc"
| 26 || November 29 || Pittsburgh Penguins || 0–3 ||  || Bishop || Tampa Bay Times Forum || 19,065 || 16–9–1 || 33 || 
|-

|- align="center" bgcolor="ffcccc"
| 27 || December 3 || @ Columbus Blue Jackets || 0–1 ||  || Bishop || Nationwide Arena || 10,223 || 16–10–1 || 33 || 
|- align="center" bgcolor="ccffcc"
| 28 || December 5 || Ottawa Senators || 3–1 ||  || Bishop || Tampa Bay Times Forum || 16,562 || 17–10–1 || 35 || 
|- align="center" bgcolor="B0C4DE"
| 29 || December 7 || Winnipeg Jets || 1–2 || OT || Lindback || Tampa Bay Times Forum || 18,354 || 17–10–2 || 36 || 
|- align="center" bgcolor="B0C4DE"
| 30 || December 10 || @ Washington Capitals || 5–6 || SO || Bishop || Verizon Center || 18,506 || 17–10–3 || 37 || 
|- align="center" bgcolor="ccffcc"
| 31 || December 12 || Detroit Red Wings || 2–1 || SO || Bishop || Tampa Bay Times Forum || 19,204 || 18–10–3 || 39 || 
|- align="center" bgcolor="ffcccc"
| 32 || December 14 || @ New Jersey Devils || 0–3 ||  || Lindback || Prudential Center || 13,832 || 18–11–3 || 39 || 
|- align="center" bgcolor="ccffcc"
| 33 || December 15 || @ Detroit Red Wings || 3–0 ||  || Bishop || Joe Louis Arena || 20,066 || 19–11–3 || 41 || 
|- align="center" bgcolor="ccffcc"
| 34 || December 17 || @ New York Islanders || 3–2 || SO || Bishop || Nassau Veterans Memorial Coliseum || 13,618 || 20–11–3 || 43 || 
|- align="center" bgcolor="ccffcc"
| 35 || December 19 || Nashville Predators || 4–2 ||  || Lindback || Tampa Bay Times Forum || 17,254 || 21–11–3 || 45 || 
|- align="center" bgcolor="ccffcc"
| 36 || December 21 || Carolina Hurricanes || 3–2 || OT || Bishop || Tampa Bay Times Forum || 19,204 || 22–11–3 || 47 || 
|- align="center" bgcolor="ccffcc"
| 37 || December 23 || @ Florida Panthers || 6–1 ||  || Bishop || BB&T Center || 15,942 || 23–11–3 || 49 || 
|- align="center" bgcolor="B0C4DE"
| 38 || December 28 || Montreal Canadiens || 1–2 || SO || Bishop || Tampa Bay Times Forum || 19,204 || 23–11–4 || 50 || 
|- align="center" bgcolor="ffcccc"
| 39 || December 29 || New York Rangers || 3–4 ||  || Lindback || Tampa Bay Times Forum || 19,204 || 23–12–4 || 50 || 
|-

|- align="center" bgcolor="ccffcc"
| 40 || January 1 || @ Vancouver Canucks || 4–2 ||  || Bishop || Rogers Arena || 18,910 || 24–12–4 || 52 || 
|- align="center" bgcolor="ccffcc"
| 41 || January 3 || @ Calgary Flames || 2–0 ||  || Bishop || Scotiabank Saddledome || 19,289 || 25–12–4 || 54 || 
|- align="center" bgcolor="ffcccc"
| 42 || January 5 || @ Edmonton Oilers || 3–5 ||  || Lindback || Rexall Place || 16,839 || 25–13–4 || 54 || 
|- align="center" bgcolor="ccffcc"
| 43 || January 7 || @ Winnipeg Jets || 4–2 ||  || Lindback || MTS Centre || 15,004 || 26–13–4 || 56 || 
|- align="center" bgcolor="ffcccc"
| 44 || January 9 || Washington Capitals || 3–4 ||  || Lindback || Tampa Bay Times Forum || 19,204 || 26–14–4 || 56 || 
|- align="center" bgcolor="ccffcc"
| 45 || January 11 || @ Philadelphia Flyers || 6–3 ||  || Lindback || Wells Fargo Center || 19,987 || 27–14–4 || 58 || 
|- align="center" bgcolor="ffcccc"
| 46 || January 13 || @ Columbus Blue Jackets || 2–3 ||  || Lindback || Nationwide Arena || 14,070 || 27–15–4 || 58 || 
|- align="center" bgcolor="ccffcc"
| 47 || January 14 || @ New York Rangers || 2–1 ||  || Bishop || Madison Square Garden || 18,006 || 28–15–4 || 60 || 
|- align="center" bgcolor="B0C4DE"
| 48 || January 16 || New York Islanders || 1–2 || SO || Bishop || Tampa Bay Times Forum || 18,333 || 28–15–5 || 61 || 
|- align="center" bgcolor="ffcccc"
| 49 || January 18 || San Jose Sharks || 4–5 ||  || Bishop || Tampa Bay Times Forum || 19,204 || 28–16–5 || 61 || 
|- align="center" bgcolor="ccffcc"
| 50 || January 19 || @ Carolina Hurricanes || 5–3 ||  || Bishop || PNC Arena || 16,760 || 29–16–5 || 63 || 
|- align="center" bgcolor="ccffcc" 
| 51 || January 23 || Ottawa Senators || 4–3 || SO || Bishop || Tampa Bay Times Forum || 18,751 || 30–16–5 || 65 || 
|- align="center" bgcolor="ccffcc"
| 52 || January 25 || Colorado Avalanche || 5–2 ||  || Bishop || Tampa Bay Times Forum || 19,204 || 31–16–5 || 67 || 
|- align="center" bgcolor="ffcccc"
| 53 || January 28 || @ Toronto Maple Leafs || 2–3 ||  || Bishop || Air Canada Centre || 19,475 || 31–17–5 || 67 || 
|- align="center" bgcolor="ffcccc"
| 54 || January 30 || @ Ottawa Senators || 3–5 ||  || Bishop || Canadian Tire Centre || 19,757 || 31–18–5 || 67 || 
|-

|- align="center" bgcolor="ccffcc"
| 55 || February 1 || @ Montreal Canadiens || 2–1 || OT || Bishop || Bell Centre || 21,273 || 32–18–5 || 69 || 
|- align="center" bgcolor="ffcccc"
| 56 || February 4 || @ Minnesota Wild || 1–2 ||  || Bishop || Xcel Energy Center || 18,454 || 32–19–5 || 69 || 
|- align="center" bgcolor="ffcccc"
| 57 || February 6 || Toronto Maple Leafs || 1–4 ||  || Desjardins || Tampa Bay Times Forum || 19,204 || 32–20–5 || 69 || 
|- align="center" bgcolor="ccffcc"
| 58 || February 8 || Detroit Red Wings || 4–2 ||  || Bishop || Tampa Bay Times Forum || 19,204 || 33–20–5 || 71 || 
|- align="center" bgcolor="#bbbbbb"
| colspan=11 |League-wide break for 2014 Winter Olympics (February 9–24)
|- align="center" bgcolor="ffcccc"
| 59 || February 27 || @ Nashville Predators || 2–3 ||  || Bishop || Bridgestone Arena || 17,113 || 33–21–5 || 71 || 
|-

|- align="center" bgcolor="ccffcc"
| 60 || March 1 || @ Dallas Stars || 4–2 ||  || Bishop || American Airlines Center || 15,897 || 34–21–5 || 73 || 
|- align="center" bgcolor="ffcccc"
| 61 || March 2 || @ Colorado Avalanche || 3–6 ||  || Bishop || Pepsi Center || 15,592 || 34–22–5 || 73 || 
|- align="center" bgcolor="ffcccc"
| 62 || March 4 || @ St. Louis Blues || 2–4 ||  || Bishop || Scottrade Center || 18,602 || 34–23–5 || 73 || 
|- align="center" bgcolor="ffcccc"
| 63 || March 6 || Buffalo Sabres || 1–3 ||  || Lindback || Tampa Bay Times Forum || 19,204 || 34–24–5 || 73 || 
|- align="center" bgcolor="B0C4DE"
| 64 || March 8 || Boston Bruins || 3–4 || SO || Bishop || Tampa Bay Times Forum || 19,204 || 34–24–6 || 74 || 
|- align="center" bgcolor="B0C4DE"
| 65 || March 10 || Phoenix Coyotes || 3–4 || SO || Bishop || Tampa Bay Times Forum || 18,167 || 34–24–7 || 75 || 
|- align="center" bgcolor="ccffcc"
| 66 || March 13 || Florida Panthers || 5–4 ||  || Bishop || Tampa Bay Times Forum || 18,324 || 35–24–7 || 77 || 
|- align="center" bgcolor="ccffcc"
| 67 || March 15 || New Jersey Devils || 3–0 ||  || Bishop || Tampa Bay Times Forum || 19,204 || 36–24–7 || 79 || 
|- align="center" bgcolor="ccffcc"
| 68 || March 17 || Vancouver Canucks || 4–3 ||  || Bishop || Tampa Bay Times Forum || 19,204 || 37–24–7 || 81 || 
|- align="center" bgcolor="ccffcc"
| 69 || March 19 || @ Toronto Maple Leafs || 5–3 ||  || Bishop || Air Canada Centre || 19,585 || 38–24–7 || 83 || 
|- align="center" bgcolor="ccffcc"
| 70 || March 20 || @ Ottawa Senators || 5–4 ||  || Bishop || Canadian Tire Centre || 17,136 || 39–24–7 || 85 || 
|- align="center" bgcolor="B0C4DE"
| 71 || March 22 || @ Pittsburgh Penguins || 3–4 || OT || Lindback || Consol Energy Center || 16,668 || 39–24–8 || 86 || 
|- align="center" bgcolor="B0C4DE"
| 72 || March 24 || Ottawa Senators || 3–4 || SO || Bishop || Tampa Bay Times Forum || 18,486 || 39–24–9 || 87 || 
|- align="center" bgcolor="ccffcc"
| 73 || March 27 || New York Islanders || 3–2 || SO || Bishop || Tampa Bay Times Forum || 18,554 || 40–24–9 || 89 || 
|- align="center" bgcolor="ccffcc"
| 74 || March 29 || @ Buffalo Sabres || 4–3 || OT || Bishop || First Niagara Center || 19,070 || 41–24–9 || 91 || 
|- align="center" bgcolor="ffcccc"
| 75 || March 30 || @ Detroit Red Wings || 2–3 ||  || Bishop || Joe Louis Arena || 20,066 || 41–25–9 || 91 || 
|-

|- align="center" bgcolor="ccffcc"
| 76 || April 1 || Montreal Canadiens || 3–1 ||  || Bishop || Tampa Bay Times Forum || 18,808 || 42–25–9 || 93 || 
|- align="center" bgcolor="ffcccc"
| 77 || April 3 || Calgary Flames || 1–4 ||  || Bishop || Tampa Bay Times Forum || 17,495 || 42–26–9 || 93 || 
|- align="center" bgcolor="ffcccc"
| 78 || April 5 || Dallas Stars || 2–5 ||  || Bishop || Tampa Bay Times Forum || 19,204 || 42–27–9 || 93 || 
|- align="center" bgcolor="ccffcc"
| 79 || April 8 || Toronto Maple Leafs || 3–0 ||  || Lindback || Tampa Bay Times Forum || 18,896 || 43–27–9 || 95 || 
|- align="center" bgcolor="ccffcc"
| 80 || April 10 || Philadelphia Flyers || 4–2 ||  || Lindback || Tampa Bay Times Forum || 19,204 || 44–27–9 || 97 || 
|- align="center" bgcolor="ccffcc"
| 81 || April 11 || Columbus Blue Jackets || 3–2 ||  || Gudlevskis || Tampa Bay Times Forum || 18,686 || 45–27–9 || 99 || 
|- align="center" bgcolor="ccffcc"
| 82 || April 13 || @ Washington Capitals || 1–0 || SO || Lindback || Verizon Center || 18,506 || 46–27–9 || 101 ||  
|-

|-
| 2013–14 Schedule
|-
| Lightning score listed first;

Playoffs

|- align="center" bgcolor="ffcccc"
| 1 || April 16 || Montreal Canadiens || 4–5 || 18:08 OT || Lindback || Tampa Bay Times Forum || 19,204 || 0–1 || 
|- align="center" bgcolor="ffcccc"
| 2 || April 18 || Montreal Canadiens || 1–4 ||  || Lindback || Tampa Bay Times Forum || 19,204 || 0–2 || 
|- align="center" bgcolor="ffcccc"
| 3 || April 20 || @ Montreal Canadiens || 2–3 ||  || Lindback || Bell Centre || 21,273 || 0–3 || 
|- align="center" bgcolor="ffcccc"
| 4 || April 22 || @ Montreal Canadiens || 3–4 || || Gudlevskis || Bell Centre || 21,273 || 0–4 ||  
|-

|-
| Lightning score listed first;

Player statistics
Final stats
Skaters

Goaltenders

†Denotes player spent time with another team before joining Tampa Bay. Stats reflect time with Tampa Bay only.
‡Traded from Tampa Bay mid-season.
Bold/italics denotes franchise record

Awards and honours

Milestones

Transactions
The Lightning have been involved in the following transactions during the 2013–14 season.

Trades

Free agents signed

Free agents lost

Claimed via waivers

Lost via waivers

Lost via retirement

Player signings

Draft picks

Tampa Bay Lightning's picks at the 2013 NHL Entry Draft, which was held in Newark, New Jersey on June 30, 2013.

Draft notes

 The Tampa Bay Lightning's third-round pick went to the Nashville Predators as the result of a June 15, 2012, trade that sent Anders Lindback, Kyle Wilson and a 2012 seventh-round pick (#202–Nikita Gusev) to the Lightning in exchange for Sebastien Caron, two 2012 second-round picks (#37–Pontus Aberg, #50–Colton Sissons) and this pick.
 The Tampa Bay Lightning's fourth-round pick went to the Edmonton Oilers (via St. Louis), Tampa Bay traded this pick to the St. Louis Blues as the result of a July 10, 2012, trade that sent B. J. Crombeen and a 2014 fifth-round pick to the Lightning in exchange a 2014 fourth-round pick and this pick.
 The Carolina Hurricanes' seventh-round pick went to the Tampa Bay Lightning as a result of an April 2, 2013, trade that sent Marc-Andre Bergeron to the Hurricanes in exchange for Adam Hall and this pick.

References

Tampa Bay Lightning seasons
Tampa Bay Lightning season, 2013-14
Tampa Bay Lightning
Tampa Bay Lightning
Tam